is a 2002 Japanese action film, starring Rei Kikukawa. A sequel to Gun Crazy: A Woman from Nowhere, it was also directed by Atsushi Muroga.

Cast
Rei Kikukawa
Toshiya Nagasawa
Kōji Shimizu
Eugene Nomura
Kaori Shimamura
Michihiro Yamanishi
Syuri Takahashi

References

External links
 

2002 films
2000s Japanese-language films
Girls with guns films
Shochiku films
2000s Japanese films

ja:GUN CRAZY